Songs for Wandering Souls is the thirteenth album by the trumpeter Dave Douglas, and the fourth to feature his Tiny Bell Trio. It was released on the German Winter & Winter label in 1999; it contains performances by Douglas, Brad Shepik and Jim Black.

Reception
The AllMusic review by Thom Jurek stated: "Songs for Wandering Souls is a truly wonderful installment in this revelatory band's journey. May it be long and prosperous".

Track listing
 "Sam Hill" - 6:09
 "At Dusk" - 6:49
 "Prolix" - 4:26
 "Loopy" - 7:31
 "One Shot" - 5:21
 "Breath-A-Thon" (Kirk) - 2:52
 "Nicht So Schnell, Mit Viel Ton Zu Spielen" (Schumann) - 4:26
 "Gowanus" - 5:36
 "Wandering Souls" - 9:13
 "Ferrous" - 3:40
All compositions by Dave Douglas except as indicated
Recorded at Avatar Studios, New York on December 1–2, 1998

Personnel
Dave Douglas: trumpet
Brad Shepik: guitar
Jim Black: drums

References

1999 albums
Dave Douglas (trumpeter) albums
Winter & Winter Records albums